This is a list of listed buildings in the northern part of the parish of Bonhill, which lies in Argyll and Bute, Scotland.  The southern part of Bonhill parish, including Bonhill itself, is within West Dunbartonshire. See List of listed buildings in Bonhill, West Dunbartonshire.

List 

|}

Key

See also 
 List of listed buildings in Argyll and Bute

Notes

References
 All entries, addresses and coordinates are based on data from Historic Scotland. This data falls under the Open Government Licence

Bonhill